Till Death Do Us Part is the ninth studio album by American death metal band Deicide, released on April 28, 2008. This is the band's longest album, being 42 minutes long and presenting some doom metal influences.  Initial copies of the album included a sew-on patch with an image of vocalist Glen Benton and the phrase "Glen Benton for President". The album was also released on several colours of vinyl in limited numbers. The artwork of the album cover is a segment of the painting Woman and Death (1518-1520) by Hans Baldung.

Track listing

Personnel
Glen Benton – bass, vocals
Steve Asheim – drums, guitars on "The Beginning of the End," "The End of the Beginning," "Angel of Agony," and "Horrors in the Halls of Stone"
Ralph Santolla – lead guitar
Jack Owen – rhythm guitar
Jim Morris – engineering, mixing, mastering

References

2008 albums
Deicide (band) albums
Earache Records albums